Glutton for Punishment is a program on Food Network hosted by Bob Blumer and produced by Paperny Entertainment. The show features the host competing in various daunting, food-related challenges.  He is given five days to become proficient enough in the episode's featured specialty, then his newly acquired skills are put to the test by matching him up against champions and experts in the field.  In several competitions, Bob Blumer surprises by qualifying ahead of many pros—and he sometimes even wins.  When he is not doing so well, he acknowledges the difficulty he has, often with self-deprecating humour. Bob recently broke the Guinness world record for the largest bowl of salsa at the Jacksonville, Texas, 26th Tomato Fest on June 12, 2010. The final bowl weighed in at 2,672 pounds. The feat was filmed for Season 5 of "Glutton," during which Bob attempted to break six world's records.

Episodes

Season 1

Season 2

Season 3

Season 4

Season 5 (Record-Breaking Edition)
Bob will attempt to break Guinness World Records.

References

External links
The Official Food Network Site
The Official Food Network Canada Site
The Official Glutton For Punishment Site
Review of the show
Production website

Food Network (Canadian TV channel) original programming
2000s Canadian cooking television series
2010s Canadian cooking television series
2007 Canadian television series debuts
2011 Canadian television series endings
Television series by Entertainment One